The West Liberty Community School District is a rural public school district headquartered in West Liberty, Iowa.

The district is mostly in Muscatine County, with smaller portions in Cedar County and Johnson County.  The district serves the city of West Liberty, and the surrounding rural areas, including the towns of Atalissa and Nichols.

Mr. Shaun Kruger was hired as superintendent in 2021.

List of schools
The West Liberty school district operates four schools, all in West Liberty:
Early Learning Center
West Liberty Elementary
West Liberty Middle School
West Liberty High School

West Liberty High School

Athletics
The Comets compete in the River Valley Conference in the following sports:

Baseball
Bowling
Basketball (boys and girls)
Cross Country (boys and girls)
Football
Golf (boys and girls)
 Coed State Champions - 1991
Soccer (boys and girls)
Softball
Swimming (boys and girls)
Tennis (boys and girls)
Track and Field (boys and girls)
Volleyball
Wrestling

See also
List of school districts in Iowa
List of high schools in Iowa

References

External links
 West Liberty Community School District

School districts in Iowa
Education in Cedar County, Iowa
Education in Johnson County, Iowa
Education in Muscatine County, Iowa